The Knickerbocker Greys is a youth cadet corps located in Manhattan. Founded in 1881, it is the oldest after school activity in the United States.

History

The Knickerbocker Greys was founded by Mrs. Augusta Lawler Stacey Curtis, the wife of Dr. Edward Curtis, a noted New York City physician who served on the staff of the Surgeon General of the Union Army, and assisted in the autopsy on the body of President Abraham Lincoln. She started the corps as a way to keep her boys out of trouble, since they had taken to hanging out at candy stores after school. At the time, there were no after school activities or organized sports.

With a group of mothers, Mrs. Curtis asked Lieutenant Adolph W. Callison of the 22nd Regiment to be a Drill Master, and found a location at the 12th Regiment New York National Guard Armory. They chose a uniform similar to that of an English organization, consisting of a gray jacket, knickerbockers, and round cap, which were all trimmed with black braid. The group's name was derived from the common nickname for early Dutch settlers of New York who wore knee-length pants known as knickerbockers. This style was adopted as the original uniform. See "knickerbockers”, and the color of the dress uniform, “Cadet Grey”.

In the winter 1886-1887 the 12th Regiment moved into their new armory, so the Greys obtained permission to drill in the armory of the 71st Regiment then at Broadway and 35th Street. They followed the Regiment first to Broadway and 45th Street and later to their armory at Park Avenue and 34th Street. During the construction of this armory on Park Avenue, the Greys used various halls about the city for one season. In 1902 the 71st Regiment Armory burned down and the Knickerbocker Greys were invited to drill in the 7th Regiment Armory (now known as the Park Avenue Armory) at Park Avenue and East 67th Street through the courtesy of Colonel Daniel Appleton.

Over the years, many of New York's prominent families enrolled their sons in the Greys. Originally an all-male organization, the Greys first accepted girls in 1986.

Notable former cadets
Hugh D. Auchincloss, stockbroker and lawyer
Cortlandt F. Bishop, aviator, balloonist, autoist, book collector, and traveler
William Sloane Coffin Sr., businessman
Henry Sloane Coffin president of the Union Theological Seminary, Moderator of the Presbyterian Church in the United States of America
William Bayard Cutting Jr., diplomat.
Douglas Fairbanks Jr., actor
Robert W. Goelet, financier and real estate developer in New York City
Hallett Johnson, diplomat and ambassador to Costa Rica
John Lindsay, congressman and mayor of New York
Austen Fox Riggs, psychiatrist and pioneering researcher in stress response
Edmund Maurice Burke Roche, British Conservative Party politician
John D Rockefeller III, philanthropist
Nelson Rockefeller, vice-president of the United States, governor of New York
Cornelius Vanderbilt III, inventor and engineer

The Knickerbocker Greys today
The program is open to boys and girls ages 7 to 16, and meet on Tuesday afternoons from 4:45 - 6pm during the school year. The Greys meet at the Park Avenue Armory at East 67th Street, where they learn traditional marching, practice color guards, practice public speaking and learn about history. 

Other activities include field trips to NY Historical Society, historical sites, community events, Veterans events and CPR lessons. As cadets master new skills, they pass on their knowledge to the younger cadets. The Greys appear in public events in New York, performing color guards for historical and civic events, marching in the Veteran's Day and Flag Day Parades, taking part in George Washington's Inauguration reenactment, and wreath laying at The Soldier's and Sailor's Monument on Memorial Day. The Greys is a 501(c)(3) charitable organization and offers financial assistance to families in need.  

In March 2022, the Armory moved to evict the Greys from their lifelong home in the 800 square foot space they use there. If the state of New York, which owns the Armory, does not give the Greys a direct lease, they will be left homeless.

References

External links
Knickerbocker Greys website
Manhattan's Littlest Soldiers New York Times article
What's a Knickerbocker? NBA New York Knicks - What is a Knickerbocker

Youth organizations based in New York City
Organizations established in 1881
1881 establishments in New York (state)